The 1958 Sun Bowl may refer to:

 1958 Sun Bowl (January), January 1, 1958, game between the Louisville Cardinals and the Drake Bulldogs
 1958 Sun Bowl (December), December 31, 1958, game between the Wyoming Cowboys and the Hardin–Simmons Cowboys